Nordwalde (literally: north woods) is a municipality in the district of Steinfurt, in North Rhine-Westphalia, Germany.

Geography
It is situated in the Münsterland area, approximately 12 km south-east of Steinfurt and 20 km north-west of Münster. The distance to the Dutch border is about 30 km.

Neighbouring municipalities
 Greven
 Emsdetten
 Altenberge
 Steinfurt

Division of the town
Nordwalde consists of 6 districts:
 Nordwalde
 Feldbauerschaft
 Kirchbauerschaft
 Scheddebrock
 Suttorf
 Westerode

Twin towns

  Amilly, France
  Treuenbrietzen, Germany

References

External links
  

Steinfurt (district)